The Cannonball Cliffs are cliffs at the south side of the terminus of Neptune Glacier on the east side of Alexander Island, Antarctica. The feature was mapped from trimetrogon air photography taken by the Ronne Antarctic Research Expedition, 1947–48, and from survey by the Falkland Islands Dependencies Survey, 1948–50. The name was applied by the UK Antarctic Place-Names Committee for the sandstone in the area, which contains numerous spherical, brown concretions known as "cannon-ball" concretions.

See also
 Burn Cliffs
 Corner Cliffs
 Callisto Cliffs

References
 

Cliffs of Alexander Island